Fadak may refer to:

 Fadak
 Fadak Metro Station, a station in Tehran Metro Line 2
 Fadak Satellite Channel

Locations 
 Fadak, Ilam
 Fadak, Razavi Khorasan

Muslim expeditions
Expedition on Fadak (disambiguation)
Expedition of Ali ibn Abi Talib (Fadak), 627 AD, 8th month of 6AH
Expedition of Bashir Ibn Sa’d al-Ansari (Fadak), December 628 AD, 3rd month 7AH
Expedition of Ghalib ibn Abdullah al-Laithi (Fadak), January 629 AD, 7AH